"Short, sharp shock" is a phrase meaning "punishment that is quick and severe." 

Short, sharp shock may also refer to:

 Short Sharp Shock (band)
 Short Sharp Shock (Short Sharp Shock album)
 Shortsharpshock, the first EP released by the band Therapy
 Short Sharp Shock (Chaos UK album), 1984
A Short, Sharp Shock, a 1990 fantasy novel written by Kim Stanley Robinson
Short Sharp Shock (film) (Kurz und schmerzlos), a 1998 film by Fatih Akin

See also 
 Short Sharp Shocked, a 1988 album by Michelle Shocked